The Women's 5 km competition at the 2019 World Aquatics Championships was held on 17 July 2019.

Results
The race was started at 08:00.

References

Women's 5 km